Vio is a surname. Notable people with the surname include:

Beatrice Vio (born 1997), Italian fencer
Betty Vio (c. 1808–1872), Italian–German opera singer
Romano Vio (1913–1984), Italian sculptor
Tomás Vio (1921–2001), Argentine basketball player
Fabio Vio (born 1949), Chilean diplomat

See also
Vio (disambiguation)